Menntaskólinn Hraðbraut (or Hraðbraut; meaning in Icelandic: speedway) was a privately run Icelandic secondary school that ran from 2003 to 2012. The school awarded a student degree after two years of study instead of the then standard four; the school's name reflected this express course.

External links 

 Hraðbraut's official website

References 

Gymnasiums in Iceland
Educational institutions established in 2003
2003 establishments in Iceland